The Smokefree Environments and Regulated Products (Smoked Tobacco) Amendment Act 2022 is an Act of Parliament in the New Zealand Parliament that seeks to combat smoking by limiting the number of retailers allowed to sell smoked tobacco products; ban the sale of smoked tobacco products to anyone born on or after 1 January 2009; and to discourage the consumption of smoked tobacco products. The bill passed its third reading on 13 December 2022 and received royal assent on 16 December 2022.

Key provisions
The Smokefree Environments and Regulated Products (Smoked Tobacco) Amendment Bill amends the Smokefree Environments and Regulated Products Act 1990 by making three changes: 
Reducing the number of retail outlets allowed to sell smoked tobacco products.
Reducing the amount of nicotine allowed in smoked tobacco products.
Prohibiting the sale of tobacco products to anyone born on or after 1 January 2009.

Key provisions include:
Prohibiting smoking and vaping in workplaces, certain public enclosed areas, registered schools, early childhood education and care centres, and vehicles carrying children.
Restricting the sale of smoked tobacco products to approved smoked tobacco retailers, who must apply to the Director-General of Health. Violators are subject to a maximum fine of $400,000.
In accordance with the principles of the Treaty of Waitangi, the Director-General of Health must consult with the Māori Health Authority, iwi-Māori partnership board or any affected Māori about approving smoked tobacco retailers in an area.
Specialist vape retailers must apply to the Director-General for approval. 
General vape retailers must inform the Director-General that they are selling vaping products.
Prohibiting the sale and delivery of smoked tobacco products to anyone born on and after 1 January 2009 (the "smokefree generation"). Violators are subject to fine not exceeding $150,000.
Prohibiting the supply of smoked tobacco products to the "smokefree generation".
Internet sites selling smoked tobacco products must display health and prohibition warnings.
Automatic vending machines selling smoked tobacco products must not be located in a public space.
Empowers the Minister of Health to prescribe the amount of nicotine allowed in smoked tobacco products.

History

Background
On 9 December 2021, Associate Health Minister Dr. Ayesha Verrall confirmed that the New Zealand Government would seek to fulfill the Smokefree 2025 goal by introducing new legislation banning anyone under the age of 14 from legally purchasing tobacco for the rest of their lives. Older generations will only be permitted to buy tobacco products with very low-levels of nicotine while fewer retailers will be allowed to sell tobacco products.  The Government's announcement was welcomed by the Green Party and several health experts including New Zealand Medical Association chair Dr Alistair Humphrey, Health Coalition Aotearoa smokefree expert advisory group chair Sally Liggins, and University of Auckland Associate Dean of Pacific Collin Tukuitonga, who stated that it would deal with the health effects of smoking on the public including the Māori and Pasifika communities. By contrast, the opposition ACT Party's health spokesperson Karen Chhour criticised the proposed law, arguing that prohibition did not work and would create a black market for tobacco products.

First reading
The Bill passed its first reading on 27 July 2022 by a margin of 109 to 10 votes. While the bill was supported by the governing Labour Party, the allied Green Party, the opposition National, and Māori parties, it was opposed by the libertarian ACT Party. Supporters of the bill including its sponsor Dr Verrall, fellow Labour Members of Parliament (MPs) Dr. Tangi Utikere, and Tracey McLellan, argued that it would address the harmful impact of smoking on the public particularly the Māori community.

National Party MPs of including Dr Shane Reti, Matt Doocey, Simon Watts, and Michael Woodhouse expressed support for the Bill's goal to combat the health effects of smoking but expressed concerned about its experimental nature and enforceability. Green MP Chlöe Swarbrick and Māori Party co-leader Debbie Ngarewa-Packer supported the bill's efforts to limit the availability of tobacco products but questioned the effectiveness of reducing nicotine content and prohibition respectively. The ACT Party's deputy-leader Brooke van Velden opposed the bill on the grounds that it limited individual rights and argued that measures to limit smoking could increasing organised crime.

Select Committee
The Health Committee released its final report on the Smokefree Environments and Regulated Products (Smoked Tobacco) Amendment Bill on 28 November 2022. The majority of its members recommended that the legislation be passed with amendments including:
Specifying that Clause 19(2) comes into force on 1 January 2027. This would ensure that the prohibition of sales to individuals under 18 years old would remain until the smokefree generation provisions began on 1 January 2027.
Clarifying the criteria for approving a smoked tobacco and specialist vape retailers.
Clarifying the application process for smoked tobacco retailers. 
Setting the criteria for setting the maximum number of tobacco retailers based on population size, the number of people, geographical nature of the area, and the views of local residents. 
Setting a cap of 600 tobacco retailers across New Zealand.
Extending the notification to all notifiable products including vaping and smoked tobacco products. The sellers of all notifiable products will also be required to renew their notifications annually. 
Limiting the number of automatic vending machines selling tobacco products.
Clarifying the visa status of smoke tobacco product sellers.
Clarifying that manufacturers and importers will be responsible for cover testing requirements of smoked tobacco products.
Specifying a maximum limit of 0.8mg/g of nicotine for any smoked tobacco product, which will come into effect 27 months after the legislation commenced.
Removing the requirement for the Crown to prove a men reas element (mental element to the offending) selling, manufacturing, and importing smoked tobacco products after their approval has been suspended.
Increasing the fine imposed on manufacturers and importers for failing to conduct certain tests from NZ$10,000 to NZ$50,000.
Creating an offence for failing to conduct certain tests.
Introducing regulations to regulate cigarette filters.

The National Party expressed concerns that reducing the number of licensed tobacco retailers to 600 and the two-year adjustment timeframe would hurt the livelihoods of many small businesses. National also opined that the "smokefree generation" concept had not been applied widely internationally and that more time was needed to assess its effectiveness. While the National Party supported the Bill's denicotisation provisions, it expressed concern that the Bill's vaping provisions were insufficient to addressing the problem. Due to these concerns, the National Party withdrew its support for the legislation.

The ACT Party opposed the Bill on the grounds that limits on the nicotine levels in tobacco products would increase smuggling and organised crime. The party also disagreed with empowering the Director-General of Health to determine which retailers should be allowed to sell cigarettes'.

Second reading
The Smokefree Environments Bill passed its second reading on 6 December 2022 by a margin of 74 to 41. The majority of parliamentarians also voted to adopt the amendments recommended by the Health Committee. The Bill was supported by Labour and the Greens and opposed by the National and ACT parties. Labour and Green MPs including the bill's sponsor Ayesha Verrall, Tangi Utikere, Dr Tracey McLellan, Chlöe Swarbrick, and Neru Leavasa argued that the Bill would help reduce smoking addiction and its adverse health effects on vulnerable and impoverished communities. National and ACT MPs including Dr Shane Reti, Harete Hipango, Brooke Van Velden, Penny Simmonds, and Maureen Pugh argued that the Bill would hurt the economic livelihood of small businesses and that banning tobacco would encourage black marketing and other criminal activities.

In committee
On 8 December 2022, Parliament voted to amend the Smokefree Environments Bill to include herbal smoking products within the scope of the Bill. This loophole is intended to prevent nicotine from being added to herbal smoking products. The majority of MPs also rejected National health spokesperson Dr Reti's proposed amendments to the Bill.

Third reading
On 13 December, the Smokefree Environment Bill passed its third and final reading by a margin of 76 to 43 votes. While Labour, the Greens, and the Māori Party voted in favour of the Bill, it was opposed by the National and ACT parties. Verrall talked about the harm caused by tobacco to communities. Dr Reti criticised the Government for targeting retailers rather than pursuing a denicotisation strategy. Green MP Swarbrick questioned the National Party's commitment to evidence-based policy-making and combating tobacco addiction. ACT Deputy Leader Van Velden described the Bill as "nanny-State prohibition" that would cause more harm and crime in the community. Māori Party co-leader Debbie Ngarewa-Packer argued that the Bill would reduce tobacco harm among young people and the Māori community.

Notes and references

External links

2022 in New Zealand law
Smoking in New Zealand
Statutes of New Zealand
Tobacco control